Valve Bone Woe is the second solo studio album by American singer-songwriter Chrissie Hynde. The album consists entirely of cover versions, and was released on September 6, 2019, by BMG Rights Management.

Critical reception

Valve Bone Woe received generally positive reviews from critics. At Metacritic, which assigns a normalized rating out of 100 to reviews from critics, the album received an average score of 77, which indicates "generally favorable reviews", based on 11 reviews.

Track listing

Personnel
Chrissie Hynde - vocals
James Walbourne - guitars (all tracks)
Peter Roth - nylon string guitar 
Marcel Camargo - nylon string guitar (on track 4)
David Hartley - piano and Rhodes (except on tracks 7 & 12)
Marius de Vries - synthesizer, piano
Matt Robertson - additional keyboards
Eldad Guetta - keyboards, guitars, trumpet, bass, percussion
Liran Doran - bass (except on track 13)
Tal Wilkenfeld - bass (on track 13)
Ian Thomas - drums

with members of The Valve Bone Woe Orchestra (except on track 7)

Charts

References

2019 albums
Chrissie Hynde albums
Albums produced by Marius de Vries
BMG Rights Management albums
Covers albums
Jazz albums by American artists